Alaska Journal of Commerce is a print and online publication based in Anchorage, Alaska. Covering business and industry in the state of Alaska, the publication was started in 1976 and was acquired by Morris Communications in 1995. Current owner Binkley Co., owner of the Anchorage Daily News, acquired the Journal in 2018.

The Alaska Journal sponsors a "Top 40 Under 40" each year  to recognize young professionals in the state. The publication is a member of the Associated Press.

References

External links
 
 Chronicling America listing from the Library of Congress

1976 establishments in Alaska
Business newspapers published in the United States
Mass media in Anchorage, Alaska
Morris Communications
Newspapers published in Alaska
Publications established in 1976
Weekly newspapers published in the United States